Kortrijk railway station, officially Kortrijk, is the main railway station in Kortrijk, West Flanders, Belgium. The station was first inaugurated on 22 September 1839. With around 10,000 passengers per day, Kortrijk is the fifteenth-busiest railway station in Belgium, and the second in West Flanders.

The following railway lines converge in this station: line 66 (Bruges - Kortrijk) and line 75 (Ghent - Moeskroen). Railway lines 69 (Kortrijk - Ieper - Poperinge) and 89 (Denderleeuw - Kortrijk) begin just outside the station. Several national Intercity-trains, Interregio-trains and local trains also stop there, as do international trains like the Intercity-train to Lille-Flandres station in Lille, France.

History
The first railway line, connecting Kortrijk to Ghent, was inaugurated on 22 September 1838 by King Leopold I and Queen Louise-Marie. The first railway station on this site was inaugurated in 1839.

The building itself was enlarged several times. The second building opened in 1857 and was enlarged in 1876. This monumental building originally included a glass and iron construction covering the platforms and rails. This construction and the original building were severely damaged during World War II.

After the war, a brand new station was inaugurated on 7 July 1956. The structure covering the platforms and rails was demolished and replaced by awnings covering the platforms.

Train services
The station is served by the following services:

Intercity services (IC-04) Lille/Poperinge - Kortrijk - Ghent - Sint-Niklaas - Antwerp
Intercity services (IC-12) Kortrijk - Ghent - Brussels - Leuven - Liege - Welkenraedt (weekdays)
Intercity services (IC-12) Kortrijk - Ghent (weekends)
Intercity services (IC-23) Ostend -  Bruges - Kortrijk - Zottegem - Brussels - Brussels Airport
Intercity services (IC-26) Kortrijk - Tournai - Halle - Brussels - Dendermonde - Lokeren - Sint Niklaas (weekdays)
Intercity services (IC-32) Bruges - Roeselare - Kortrijk
Local services (L-05) Kortrijk - Oudenaarde - Ghent - Eeklo (weekdays)

Railway stations in Kortrijk
Other railway stations in Kortrijk are:
 Kortrijk-Vorming railway station (previously called Congostatie)
 Bissegem railway station

Former railway stations in Kortrijk are:
 Aalbeke railway station
 Heule railway station
 Heule-Leiaarde railway station
 Kortrijk-Weide railway station
 Kortrijk-West railway station
 Marke railway station
 Sint-Katerine railway station

See also
 List of railway stations in Belgium

References

Railway stations in Belgium
Railway stations in West Flanders
Buildings and structures in Kortrijk
Railway stations in Belgium opened in 1839